East Syriac Church or East Syriac church refers to any church that performs the East Syriac Rite.

 Syriac Church of the East, medieval East Syriac Church, with modern branches:
 Assyrian Church of the East
 Ancient Church of the East
 Syro-Chaldean Catholic Church, uses Chaldean variant of the East Syriac Rite
 Syro-Malabar Catholic Church, uses Malabar variant of the East Syriac Rite

See also
 East Syriac (disambiguation)
 Syriac (disambiguation)
 Syriac Rite (disambiguation)
 West Syriac Church (disambiguation)